Taylor Ross Whitley (February 21, 1980 – August 1, 2018) was an American football guard in the National Football League. He played two years with the Miami Dolphins (2003-2004), one year with the Denver Broncos (2005), and another with the Washington Redskins.

References

1980 births
2018 deaths
People from Houston
American football offensive guards
Texas A&M Aggies football players
Miami Dolphins players
Denver Broncos players
Washington Redskins players
Place of death missing